Coralliomyzontidae is a family of crustaceans belonging to the order Siphonostomatoida.

Genera:
 Cholomyzon Stock & Humes, 1969
 Coralliomyzon Humes & Stock, 1991
 Temanus Humes, 1997
 Tondua Humes, 1997

References

Siphonostomatoida